The 1905 international cricket season was from April 1905 to August 1905. The season consists with the famous British Authors vs British Actors cricket match in England.

Season overview

May

Australia in England

June

Actors vs Authors in England

July

MCC in USA

References

International cricket competitions by season
1905 in cricket